Gekko pradapdao is a species of gecko. It is endemic to Thailand.

References 

Gekko
Reptiles described in 2021